Shahed Sharif Khan is a Bangladeshi television and film actor, director, and writer. In 1998, he started working as the first model. He has been nominated for the Meril Prothom Alo Awards three times. Among the notable works of Shahed Sharif are Shenapati (India), Prio Shathi, Joy Jatra, Hridoy Sudhu Tomar Jonno, Tok Jhal Mishti. He has acted in Bengali films in Kolkata, India as well as Bangladesh.

Personal life
In 2003, Shahed married veteran actor Abul Hayat's daughter Natasha Hayat, which made him brother-in-law of Bipasha Hayat and Tauquir Ahmed.

Career
Sharif Khan started his career in 2000 with the television series Ekannoborti, where he was featured alongside Moutushi Biswas, who also began her career in it, and Abul Hayat. The show was written by Anisul Hoque and directed by Mostofa Sarwar Farooki. Sharif Khan made his film debut with Tak Jhaal Mishti in 2002. He appeared in Tak Jhaal Mishti (2002), Hridoy Sudhu Tomar Jonno (2004), Joyjatra (2004) and Oggatonama (2016). In 2017, Indian director Riingo Banerjee cast him in Senapati opposite Bollywood actors Riya Sen and Parambrata Chatterjee.

Sharif Khan and Moutushi Biswas worked together again in Chayanika Chowdhury's Koshto Koshto Shukh and Father, May I Hold Your Hand, directed by Abul Hayat, his father-in-law. In 2020, he played the role of a father in a short film about a girl who was raped as a teenager called "Patrisotta".

Films

Television drama

Television drama 

 Ainar Shatha Alingon telecasted at ATN Bangla.
 Fashion (26 Episode) telecasted at Channel i.
 Astalavista telecasted at Boisakhi TV.
 Bubai telecasted at Channel i.

Poetry
In 2017, Sharif Khan published a book of poems titled Tomar Jonno, with verses that follow the form of conversations, which he personally presented at the Ekushey Book Fair.

References

External links 

Bangladeshi male television actors
Bangladeshi male film actors
Living people
Year of birth missing (living people)